Levilinea saccharolytica is a mesophilic, non-spore-forming, non-motile, Gram-negative, filamentous bacteria with type strain KIBI-1T (=JCM 12578T =DSM 16555T), the type species of its genus.

References

Further reading
Beatty, Tom J. Genome Evolution of Photosynthetic Bacteria. Vol. 66. Academic Press, 2013.
Tewari, Vinod, Vinod C. Tewari, and Joseph Seckbach, eds.STROMATOLITES: Interaction of Microbes with Sediments: Interaction of Microbes with Sediments. Vol. 18. Springer, 2011.
Dilek, Yıldırım. Links Between Geological Processes, Microbial Activities & Evolution of Life: Microbes and Geology. Eds. Yildirim Dilek, H. Furnes, and Karlis Muehlenbachs. Vol. 4. Springer, 2008.

External links

LPSN
Type strain of Levilinea saccharolytica at BacDive -  the Bacterial Diversity Metadatabase

Gram-negative bacteria
Chloroflexota
Bacteria described in 2006